Bradford Ripley Wood (September 3, 1800 – September 26, 1889) was a U.S. Representative from New York.

Early life and legal career
Born in Westport, Connecticut, Wood attended the common schools and in 1824 he graduated from Union College in Schenectady, New York. He was engaged in teaching delivering lectures on temperance and other topics, and later studied law with Robert Lansing and Harmanus Bleecker. After studying at the Litchfield Law School Wood attained admission to the bar in 1827 and commenced practice in Albany, New York.

On May 29, 1827, Wood was made solicitor in the New York Court of Chancery. He became counselor in the New York Supreme Court in 1835 and in the United States Supreme Court in 1845. He served as member of the Albany County board of supervisors in 1844.

Political career
Wood was elected as a Democrat to the Twenty-ninth Congress (March 4, 1845 – March 3, 1847). He was an unsuccessful candidate for reelection in 1846 to the Thirtieth Congress. He served as president of the Young Men's Temperance Society in 1851. He also served as trustee of Union College, Williams College, and the Albany Law School, and was vice president of the Albany Medical College.

Wood was one of the founders of the Republican Party in New York State in 1855, and ran for the New York Court of Appeals in November 1855 on the Republican ticket. He was also vice president of the American Home Missionary Society, and founded of the First Congregational Church in Albany. He served as United States Minister to Denmark from 1861 to 1865. He died in Albany, New York on September 26, 1889, and was interred in Albany Rural Cemetery, New York.

See also

References

External links
 
 

1800 births
1889 deaths
Ambassadors of the United States to Denmark
Union College (New York) alumni
Litchfield Law School alumni
New York (state) Republicans
New York (state) lawyers
People from Westport, Connecticut
People from Albany County, New York
Burials at Albany Rural Cemetery
19th-century American diplomats
Democratic Party members of the United States House of Representatives from New York (state)
19th-century American politicians
19th-century American lawyers